The 1971 Stanley Cup Finals was the championship series of the National Hockey League's (NHL) 1970–71 season, and the culmination of the 1971 Stanley Cup playoffs. It was contested between the Chicago Black Hawks and the Montreal Canadiens. The Black Hawks made their first appearance in the finals since 1965, while the Canadiens had last played in and won the final in 1969. The Canadiens won the series, four games to three.

Paths to the Finals
The playoff system changed this year to allow cross-over between the divisions during the playoffs.

Chicago defeated the Philadelphia Flyers 4–0 and the New York Rangers 4–3 to advance to the final.

Montreal defeated the defending champion Boston Bruins 4–3 and the Minnesota North Stars 4–2. This set up the first "Original Six" Finals since the 1967 Stanley Cup Finals.

Game summaries
Brothers Frank and Peter Mahovlich starred for the Canadiens, scoring nine goals in the seven-game final series. Ken Dryden debuted for the Canadiens, while this was Jean Beliveau's last Finals appearance. He ended his career with ten championships. This was only the second time that the road team won a game seven in Finals history. The only previous time it happened was when the Toronto Maple Leafs defeated the Detroit Red Wings 2–1 in game seven in the 1945 Stanley Cup Finals in Detroit. Montreal also won the series despite losing the first two games on the road; none happened again until 2009, when the Pittsburgh Penguins defeated the Red Wings in game seven by the same 2–1 score after losing the first two games to the Red Wings. The next seven-game Stanley Cup Finals did not occur until the 1987 Stanley Cup Finals with the Edmonton Oilers and the Philadelphia Flyers.

Montreal wins the series 4–3.

Game one

Game two

Game three

Game four

Game five

Game six

Game seven

Coaching controversies
Both clubs would suffer public controversies regarding coaching performances, specifically accusations of mishandling star players during the series.

Chicago head coach Billy Reay would be attacked in the media by Hawks star forward Bobby Hull for his excessive employment of two little used forwards, Lou Angotti and Eric Nesterenko, as well as the injured defenseman Keith Magnuson in game seven. With a 2–0 Black Hawks lead, both Hull and Hawks star center Stan Mikita were left on the bench for extended periods in favor of Angotti and Nesterenko, including two four-on-four situations. The wide open matchup should have favored the frustrated Hull, who had been successfully shadowed in the series by Canadiens rookie Rejean Houle. The first two Canadien goals were tallied with the two backliners on the ice and the hobbled Magnuson was beaten one on one by speedy Montreal center Henri Richard for the ultimate game winner.

The Canadiens suffered their own coaching controversy earlier in the series when head coach Al MacNeil benched alternate captain Henri Richard in game five. Following the 2-0 loss, Richard ripped MacNeil in the media calling him incompetent and "the worst coach I ever played for." Accusation of favoring English-speaking players plagued MacNeil and turned the public against him. Following death threats, MacNeil and his family were assigned body guards for the final home game in Montreal. Even the eventual series victory wouldn't be enough to save MacNeil's job. He was replaced as head coach by Scotty Bowman soon after the finals.

Stanley Cup engraving
The 1971 Stanley Cup was presented to Canadiens captain Jean Beliveau by NHL President Clarence Campbell following the Canadiens 3–2 win over the Black Hawks in game seven.

The following Canadiens players and staff had their names engraved on the Stanley Cup

1970–71 Montreal Canadiens

See also
 1970–71 NHL season

Notes

References
 
 

Stanley Cup
Stanley Cup Finals
Chicago Blackhawks games
Montreal Canadiens games
Stanley Cup Finals
Ice hockey competitions in Chicago
Ice hockey competitions in Montreal
1970s in Chicago
1970s in Montreal
1971 in Quebec
Stanley Cup Finals